Bryobia graminum, also known as the clover mite, is a species of mite with a cosmopolitan distribution.

It was first described in 1781 by Franz von Paula Schrank as Acarus graminum.

Its hosts are mainly herbaceous plants (grasses & daisies).

Synonymy 
Further synonymy is given in the Australian government funded Lucid key to mites.

 Bryobia cristata (Duges) Oudemans, 1905, synonymy Livshits & Mitrofanov, 1971
 Bryobia haustor (Hardy) Oudemans, 1937, synonymy Oudemans, 1937

References

External links
 Spider mites of Australia: Bryobia graminum

Trombidiformes
Animals described in 1871
Arachnids of Australia